
Gmina Węgorzewo is an urban-rural gmina (administrative district) in Węgorzewo County, Warmian-Masurian Voivodeship, in northern Poland, on the border with Russia.

Villages
Apart from the town of Węgorzewo, Gmina Węgorzewo contains the villages and settlements of Biedaszki, Brzozowo, Czerwony Dwór, Dąbrówka Mała, Dłużec, Dowiackie Nowiny, Guja, Jakunowo, Janówko, Jerzykowo, Kal, Kalskie Nowiny, Kamień, Kamionek Wielki, Karłowo, Kietlice, Klimki, Kolonia Rybacka, Łabapa, Łęgwarowo, Maćki, Mamerki, Matyski, Nowa Guja, Ogonki, Parowa, Pasternak, Perły, Pilwa, Pniewo, Prynowo, Przystań, Radzieje, Róże, Różewiec, Rudziszki, Ruska Wieś, Rydzówka, Skrzypy, Sobin, Stawiska, Stawki, Stręgiel, Stulichy, Surwile, Sztynort, Sztynort Mały, Tarławki, Trygort, Węgielsztyn, Wesołowo, Wilkowo, Wysiecza, Zacisz, Zacisze and Zielony Ostrów.

Neighbouring gminas
Gmina Węgorzewo is bordered by the gminas of Budry, Giżycko, Kętrzyn, Pozezdrze and Srokowo. It also borders Russia (Kaliningrad oblast).

References
Polish official population figures 2006

Wegorzewo
Węgorzewo County

de:Węgorzewo#Gmina